In Italy, after  the  Second World War, many armed, paramilitary, far-right organizations were active, as well as far-left ones.

Background
The attempt to endorse the neo-fascist Italian Social Movement (MSI) by the Tambroni Cabinet, in 1960, led to rioting and was short-lived. Widespread labor unrest and the collaboration of countercultural student activist groups with working class factory workers and pro-labor radical leftist organizations such as Potere Operaio and Lotta Continua culminated in the so-called "Hot Autumn" of 1969, a massive series of strikes in factories and industrial centres in Northern Italy. Student strikes and labour strikes, often led by workers, leftists, left-sympathizing laborers, or Marxist activists, became increasingly common, often deteriorating into clashes between the police and demonstrators composed largely of workers, students, activists, and often left-wing militants.

In the same period, various organizations with a far-right ideology also emerged in Italy and undertook violent action.

Young neo-fascists perceived the legal, neo-fascist political party MSI as betraying them through its ostensible inaction in the face of attacks by the police and political opponents, as in the case of the Acca Larentia killings. Influenced by theories of urban guerrilla warfare and spontaneism, a  number of neo-fascists  moved from street-fighting to terrorism.
For more information, see Years of Lead and Strategy of tension.

Organizations

See also
Right-wing populism
 Left-wing militant groups in Italy
Italian fascism

Notes

References

Further reading

External links

Clandestine groups
Terrorism in Italy
Far-right politics in Italy
Neo-fascist organisations in Italy
Neo-fascist terrorism
Factions of the Years of Lead (Italy)
Defunct organisations designated as terrorist in Italy